Planomicrobium chinense is a Gram-positive, aerobic and motile bacterium from the genus of Planomicrobium which has been isolated from sediments from the coast of the Eastern China Sea in China.

References

Bacillales
Bacteria described in 2005